Eli Franklin Peckumn (January 29, 1873 – January 17, 1953) was an American football player and coach.  He served as the head football coach at Morningside College in 1904, compiling a record of 0–4–3.  Peckumn played college football at Northwestern University, lettering in 1900, 1902, and 1903.

Head coaching record

References

External links
 

1873 births
1953 deaths
Morningside Mustangs football coaches
Northwestern Wildcats football players